Roberto Mazzoleni (born 29 March 1964) is a retired Italian sprinter who specialized in the 400 metres.

Biography
At the 1995 World Indoor Championships he won a silver medal in the 4 x 400 metres relay, together with teammates Fabio Grossi, Andrea Nuti and Ashraf Saber.

Mazzoleni personal best time of 47.23 seconds in the 400 m was achieved in May 1994 in Rome.

Achievements

References

External links
 
 Roberto Mazzoleni at The-sports.org

1964 births
Living people
Italian male sprinters
World Athletics Indoor Championships medalists